Nizar Khalfan (born 21 June 1988) is a Tanzanian footballer who plays for Pamba S.C.

Career

Early career
Khalfan started playing football in his hometown of Mtwara with a youth team called Score FC. As a student Khalfan attended Ligula Primary School and Ocean Secondary School in Mtwara.

Club
Khalfan began his career with Mtibwa Sugar FC. He then joined the Kuwaiti Premier League club Al Tadamon for the 2007–08 season. In January 2008 he left Al Tadamon for Lebanese club Tadamon Sour, but soon returned to the Tanzanian Premier League with Moro United. He joined Canadian side Vancouver Whitecaps FC on 22 August 2009. He played nine games for the Caps in their successful 2009 season and signed a contract extension to play with the team in 2010. He scored his first goal for the Whitecaps on 12 June 2010 in a game against the Austin Aztex. On 9 February 2011 signed a new one-year contract for the 2011 Major League Soccer season.
Khalfan was waived by Vancouver on 23 November 2011, and was selected in the MLS Waiver Draft by Philadelphia Union. The Union released him three months later prior to the 2012 season.

International
Khalfan was formerly a member of the Tanzania national football team. He played in five of Tanzania's qualifying matches for the 2010 FIFA World Cup, scoring in the 4–1 victory over Mauritius on 6 September 2008. He also scored the game-winning goal in a 2–1 victory over Burkina Faso at the Benjamin Mkapa National Stadium in Dar-es-Salaam on 14 June 2007.

International goals
The following information is valid up to 11 November 2011.

References

External links
 
 Vancouver Whitecaps bio
 

1988 births
Living people
People from Mtwara Region
Tanzanian footballers
Association football midfielders
Tanzania international footballers
Tanzanian expatriate footballers
Expatriate footballers in Lebanon
Tanzanian expatriate sportspeople in Lebanon
Expatriate footballers in Kuwait
Tanzanian expatriate sportspeople in Kuwait
Expatriate soccer players in Canada
Tanzanian expatriate sportspeople in Canada
USL First Division players
USSF Division 2 Professional League players
Major League Soccer players
Lebanese Premier League players
Mtibwa Sugar F.C. players
Tadamon Sour SC players
Moro United F.C. players
Vancouver Whitecaps (1986–2010) players
Vancouver Whitecaps FC players
Young Africans S.C. players
Mwadui United F.C. players
Singida United F.C. players
Kuwait Premier League players
Al Tadhamon SC players
Homegrown Players (MLS)
Tanzanian Premier League players
2009 African Nations Championship players
Tanzania A' international footballers